Pseudocyphellaria is a genus of large, leafy lichens that are sometimes referred to as "specklebelly" lichens.  The genus has a widespread distribution, especially in south temperate regions, and contains about 170 species. They resemble Lobaria, except that most species of Pseudocyphellaria have conspicuous pseudocyphellae on their lower surface, a characteristic that was once considered unique to this genus. Some species contain pulvinic acid-related pigments; in these species the soredia and pseudocyphellae can be bright yellow.

Taxonomy
Pseudocyphellaria was originally circumscribed in 1890 by Finnish lichenologist Edvard August Vainio, with P. aurata as the type species. In the 2010s, molecular phylogenetic analyses showed that this species, along with a few others, nested within a small clade separate from most Pseudocyphellaria. These species, characterised by a yellow medulla containing pulvinic acid derivatives and fernene triterpenoids, were placed in a resurrected genus, Crocodia, while Pseudocyphellaria was proposed for conservation with a new type species, P. crocata. This proposal was later accepted by the Nomenclature Committee for Fungi.

The Pseudocyphellaria symbiosis
Many species of Pseudocyphellaria are cyanolichens and contain the cyanobacterium Nostoc as a photobiont, which allows nitrogen fixation.  In some species of Pseudocyphellaria the cyanobacterium is the sole photobiont, while other species also contain the green alga Dictyochloropsis and restrict the cyanobacterium to warty cephalodia on the lower surface of the lichen.

Some species of Pseudocyphellaria appear to be able to use either a cyanobacterium or a green algae as their photobiont.  DNA tests have shown that the fungal symbionts in P. murrayi (which is in a symbiosis with a cyanobacterium) and P. rufovirescens  (which is in a symbiosis with a green alga) are actually the same species.  This means that P. murrayi-P. rufovirescens is actually one species of fungus that is capable of forming two very different lichens, one with a cyanobacterium and one with a green alga.  Two other possible pairs of Pseudocyphellaria species that may be capable of choosing their photobiont are P. knightii-P. lividofusca, and P. kookeri-P. durietzii.

Ecological significance
Most Pseudocyphellaria grow on trees in coastal areas, from the subtropics to the boreal zones, although some species can occasionally be found growing on mossy rocks or growing inland.  Many species of Pseudocyphellaria are restricted to old-growth forests in humid areas, and are therefore threatened by logging. The limited light conditions of dense young forests can severely decrease the growth of Pseudocyphellaria crocata compared to more open, old-growth forests, and the excess of light from clearcuts can also cause damage to the lichen.  Because they are often restricted to humid forests in undisturbed areas, species of Pseudocyphellaria are often used as indicators of valuable old growth forests.

Pseudocyphellaria rainierensis is listed as vulnerable in Canada by COSEWIC.  Pseudocyphellaria crocata has disappeared from much of Scandinavia, a development that has been partly attributed to an increase in grazing from snails, presumably as a result of global warming. In the areas of Scandinavia where P. crocata is still found, it seems restricted to growing on smaller twigs that are harder for the snails to reach.

Species
Pseudocyphellaria allanii  – New Zealand
Pseudocyphellaria argyracea 
Pseudocyphellaria bartlettii 
Pseudocyphellaria berteroana 
Pseudocyphellaria biliana 
Pseudocyphellaria billardierei 
Pseudocyphellaria brattii 
Pseudocyphellaria carpoloma 
Pseudocyphellaria chloroleuca 
Pseudocyphellaria citrina 
Pseudocyphellaria clathrata 
Pseudocyphellaria confusa 
Pseudocyphellaria crocata 
Pseudocyphellaria crocatoides 
Pseudocyphellaria dasyphyllidia 
Pseudocyphellaria desfontainii 
Pseudocyphellaria deyi 
Pseudocyphellaria dissimilis 
Pseudocyphellaria dozyana 
Pseudocyphellaria epiflavoides 
Pseudocyphellaria faveolata 
Pseudocyphellaria gallowayana 
Pseudocyphellaria gilva 
Pseudocyphellaria glabra 
Pseudocyphellaria glaucescens 
Pseudocyphellaria granulata 
Pseudocyphellaria haywardiorum 
Pseudocyphellaria hirsuta 
Pseudocyphellaria holarctica 
Pseudocyphellaria insculpta 
Pseudocyphellaria intricata 
Pseudocyphellaria lacerata 
Pseudocyphellaria longiloba 
Pseudocyphellaria louwhoffiae 
Pseudocyphellaria macroisidiata 
Pseudocyphellaria mallota 
Pseudocyphellaria mooreana 
Pseudocyphellaria multifida 
Pseudocyphellaria neglecta 
Pseudocyphellaria nitida 
Pseudocyphellaria norvegica 
Pseudocyphellaria patagonica 
Pseudocyphellaria perpetua 
Pseudocyphellaria philipiana 
Pseudocyphellaria pomaikaiana 
Pseudocyphellaria prolificans 
Pseudocyphellaria punctata 
Pseudocyphellaria punctillaris 
Pseudocyphellaria rigida 
Pseudocyphellaria rubella 
Pseudocyphellaria rubrina 
Pseudocyphellaria rufovirescens 
Pseudocyphellaria sandwicensis 
Pseudocyphellaria sayeri 
Pseudocyphellaria semilanata 
Pseudocyphellaria sericeofulva 
Pseudocyphellaria soredioglabra 
Pseudocyphellaria stenophylla 
Pseudocyphellaria sulphurea 
Pseudocyphellaria xanthosticta

Traditional use

Several species of Pseudocyphellaria can be utilized to produce a brown to orange-brown dye, and some of them have been used to dye wool in Britain and Scandinavia. One species of Pseudocyphellaria is used in Madagascar to make a tea used to treat indigestion.
  
Besides being yellow, pulvinic acid derivatives are highly toxic. Any species of Pseudocyphellaria that has yellow structures probably contains one of these compounds, and may be toxic if ingested.

Gallery

References

External links
 Picture of Pseudocyphellaria aurata on Lichens of North America webpage
 Picture of Pseudocyphellaria crocata on Lichens of North America webpage
 Picture of Pseudocyphellaria rainierensis on Lichens of North America webpage

 
Lichen genera
Peltigerales genera
Taxa described in 1890
Taxa named by Edvard August Vainio